The Meerasaheb dargah of Hazarat sayyad Khawaja Muhammadmira hussaini chishti shamsul ushaq and his son Shahide akbar Hazarat sayyad Khwaja Shamsuddin al ma-ruf shamnamira ganj baksh chishti r.a. is a common worship centre for both Muslim and Hindu communities located near the railway station of Miraj. Meerasahab is from  the Chishti Sufi spiritual order.

Thousands of people flock to Dargah on every Thursday morning to get the blessings of Hazarat Meerasaheb and his son Hazarat Shamsuddin Hussein. Hazrat Meerasaheb was a great Sufi saint of his time. It is said that on the command of Allah he migrated to India from Mecca (Saudi Arabia). He propagated Islam through his life. Every year URS (martyrdom day) is celebrated with millions of people visits this shrine for offering their salutes.

Dargahs in India